Richie Cannata (born March 3, 1949) is an American music producer, saxophonist, keyboardist and studio owner. He is most notable for playing saxophone in Billy Joel's band alongside Liberty DeVitto, Russell Javors, and Doug Stegmeyer. After leaving the band in 1981, he opened Cove City Sound Studios in Glen Cove, New York. Artists including Celine Dion, Billy Joel, Jennifer Lopez and Marc Anthony have recorded in Cannata's studio.

Early life

Cannata was born 3 March 1949 in Brooklyn, New York, the son of Ernest (26 March 1914 – 14 April 1993) and Anna (February 25, 1926 — 1 April 2007) Cannata. Interested in music from a very early age, Cannata was introduced by his family first to the piano at the age of four and later to clarinet and tenor saxophone at the age of eight. He also plays flute and keyboards in addition to alto, soprano and baritone sax.

In 1950s his family moved to Garden City South where Cannata blossomed as a musician. He played his first gig at the age of 13 and went on to play in school bands and with local musicians, perfecting his skills as a live performer and studio musician.

Career

In 1975 Cannata was introduced to Billy Joel's bass player Doug Stegmeyer through Stegmeyer's brother Al. At the time Billy Joel was looking for a sax player and Cannata was given a position in the band.

Cannata played in Tommy Shaw's band in the mid-1980s, performing on Shaw's first three solo albums.  He also played for Taylor Dayne in the late 1980s/early 1990s, and was a saxophonist with Bernie Williams.

From 1991 until 1998, Cannata toured with The Beach Boys, playing saxophone, woodwinds and synthesizers. In 2006, Cannata briefly toured again with Joel, and was part of his record-setting 12-show run at Madison Square Garden.

Over the years Cannata's performing style has been influenced by John Coltrane, Charlie Parker, Gene Ammons, and King Curtis.

In December 2013 Cannata and Sean J. Kennedy's educational jazz improv play-along series Improvising and Soloing In The Pocket [Book/CD/DVD) was released by Carl Fischer Music to critical acclaim. The series includes books for all instruments, and features music from Cannata's 2011 solo album Richie Cannata, featuring Cannata and Julio Fernandez, guitarist of jazz fusion/smooth jazz group Spyro Gyra.

On October 23, 2014, Cannata, DeVitto, and Javors (with Stegmeyer, posthumously) were inducted into the Long Island Music Hall of Fame, primarily for their work with Joel. Shortly thereafter, Cannata, DeVitto, and Javors officially formed The Lords of 52nd Street band; the band also includes a pianist and lead vocalist, keyboardist, and a guitarist, and plays faithful renditions of the recorded Joel originals.

On July 11, 2016, Cannata received special recognition from Glen Cove Mayor for his contributions to the city's music heritage. He was presented with the key to Glen Cove and named the downtown intersection of Bridge, School and Glen Streets as "Richie Cannata Place" for the city's summer music season.

See also
Billy Joel Band
The Lords of 52nd Street

Billy Joel album credits
1976 Turnstiles
1977 The Stranger
1978 52nd Street
1980 Glass Houses
1981 Songs in the Attic
1985 Greatest Hits Volume I & II
1993 River of Dreams
1997 Greatest Hits Volume III

External links

 Cove City Sound Studios

References

Living people
American rock saxophonists
American male saxophonists
1949 births
Musicians from New York (state)
People from Glen Cove, New York
American woodwind musicians
American multi-instrumentalists
Record producers from New York (state)
American flautists
American male organists
American clarinetists
21st-century American saxophonists
21st-century clarinetists
21st-century organists
21st-century American keyboardists
21st-century American male musicians
Billy Joel Band members
American organists
21st-century flautists